The Tavria operational-strategic group, or operational grouping of troops "Tavria", is a formation of the Ukrainian Ground Forces in Ukraine active in the 2022 Russian invasion of Ukraine. The Tavria operational-strategic group is led by Brigadier General Oleksandr Tarnavskyi. On December 17, the Tavria operational group received additional military vehicles. General Tarnavskyi believed that Russian forces no longer had a deep rear element in the Tavria direction as of January 7, 2023.

References 

Military units and formations of Ukraine
Tavria